Thomas 'Tom' Albert Azinger (born July 2, 1935, in Parkersburg, West Virginia) is an American politician and former Republican member of the West Virginia House of Delegates. He represented District 10 from January 1995 until his retirement in 2014.

Education
Azinger earned his BS degree from West Virginia University.

Elections
2012 Azinger placed second in the three-way May 8, 2012 Republican Primary with 3,355 votes (35.4%), and placed first in the four-way three-position November 6, 2012 General election with 12,955 votes (27.1%) ahead of incumbent Republican Representative John Ellem, Democratic Representative Daniel Poling, and Republican perennial candidate Frederick Gillespie, who had run for the seat in 2000, 2002, 2004, 2006, 2008, and 2010.
1990s Azinger was initially elected in the 1994 Republican Primary and the November 8, 1994 General election, and re-elected in the November 5, 1996 General election.
1998 Azinger placed in the four-way 1998 Republican Primary and was re-elected in the seven-way three-position November 3, 1998 General election with Democratic incumbent J. D. Beane and Republican nominee Gene Modesitt.
2000 Azinger placed in the four-way 2000 Republican Primary and was re-elected in the six-way three-position November 7, 2000 General election with incumbents Beane (D) and Modesitt (R).
2002 Azinger placed in the five-way 2002 Republican Primary and was re-elected in the six-way three-position November 5, 2002 General election with incumbents Beane (D) and Ellem (R), who had been appointed to replace Modesitt.
2004 Azinger placed in the five-way 2004 Republican Primary and was re-elected in the six-way three-position November 2, 2004 General election with incumbents Beane (D) and Ellem (R).
2006 Azinger placed in the four-way 2006 Republican Primary and was re-elected in the six-way three-position November 7, 2006 General election with incumbents Beane (D) and Ellem (R).
2008 When Representative Beane left the Legislature and appointed Representative Daniel Poling (D) ran for re-election, Azinger placed first in the seven-way May 13, 2008 Republican Primary with 3,109 votes (23.9%), and placed first in the six-way three-position November 4, 2008 General election with 11,067 votes (19.2%) ahead of incumbent Representatives Ellem (R) and Poling (D).
2010 Azinger placed first in the eight-way May 11, 2010 Republican Primary with 2,613 votes (21.4%), and placed second in the four-way three-position November 2, 2010 General election with 9,853 votes (26.8%) behind incumbent Ellem (R) and ahead of incumbent Poling (D) and Republican nominee Frederick Gillespie.

References

External links
Official page at the West Virginia Legislature

Tom Azinger at Ballotpedia
Tom Azinger at OpenSecrets

1935 births
Living people
Republican Party members of the West Virginia House of Delegates
Politicians from Parkersburg, West Virginia
People from Vienna, West Virginia
West Virginia University alumni
21st-century American politicians